Dallas Eliuk (born November 4, 1964 in Vancouver, British Columbia) is a former goaltender and assistant coach in the National Lacrosse League. Upon his retirement from play, Eliuk coached one season with the Portland LumberJax and two with the Colorado Mammoth. Dallas played for 18 years, 15 seasons for the Philadelphia Wings before being traded to the LumberJax (per his request), where he played for three seasons. Eliuk won four championships with the Wings, two championship MVP awards, was named to the All-Pro team nine times, and retired as the league's all-time leader in saves. Because of his success, his longevity, and unparalleled acrobatic athleticism, he is considered a legend in indoor lacrosse, and widely regarded as the best goalie to ever to play the game.

Eliuk was inducted into the Canadian Lacrosse Hall of Fame November 2013. Eliuk and Jim Veltman were inducted into the National Lacrosse League Hall of Fame in March, 2009.

In January 2005, when the Wings were in Anaheim for a game against the Storm, several members of the team, including Eliuk, went to a taping of the game show The Price Is Right. Eliuk was chosen to participate, and won a world-map lithograph, some dinnerware, and an exercise machine. The episode aired on February 11, 2005.

Eliuk married former Radio D.J. Daria O'Neill on December 31, 2007. Their first child Xander Eliuk was born in May 2009.

Statistics

NLL

References

Awards

1964 births
National Lacrosse League All-Stars
Canadian lacrosse players
Lacrosse people from British Columbia
Living people
National Lacrosse League coaches
Portland LumberJax players
Philadelphia Wings players
Sportspeople from Vancouver
Sportspeople from Portland, Oregon
Lacrosse goaltenders